Kushneria marisflavi is a Gram-negative and halophilic bacterium from the genus of Kushneria which has been isolated from the Yellow Sea in Korea.

References

Oceanospirillales
Bacteria described in 2001